Alpha Eta Mu Beta ( or AEMB) is a biomedical engineering honor society founded by Dr. Daniel Reneau of Louisiana Tech University, United States, in 1979. The first chapter of AEMB was founded at Louisiana Tech University. Membership of AEMB is offered to the top fifth of juniors and top third of seniors in biomedical engineering, who have completed at least six semester credit hours (or the equivalent) of biomedical engineering courses.

Chapters

References 

 AEMB chapters

External links 

 Official website
 ACHS Alpha Eta Mu Beta entry
 Alpha Eta Mu Beta chapter list

Honor societies
Student organizations established in 1979
Association of College Honor Societies
1979 establishments in Louisiana